The Bram Stoker Award for Poetry Collection is an award presented by the Horror Writers Association (HWA) for "superior achievement" in horror writing for a poetry collection.

Winners and nominees

References

External links
 Stoker Award on the HWA web page
 Graphical listing of all Bram Stoker award winners and nominees
 The Official Bram Stoker Awards website
 

Poetry Collection
Poetry awards
Awards established in 2000
2000 establishments in the United States
English-language literary awards